The Brazil men's national under-21 volleyball team represents Brazil in international men's volleyball competitions and friendly matches under  the age 21 and it is ruled by the Brazilian Volleyball Federation that is a member of South American volleyball body Confederación Sudamericana de Voleibol (CSV) and the international volleyball body government the Fédération Internationale de Volleyball (FIVB).

Results

U21 World Championship
 Champions   Runners up   Third place   Fourth place

U21 South America Championship

 Champions   Runners up   Third place   Fourth place

U21 Pan-American Cup

 Champions   Runners up   Third place   Fourth place

Team

Current squad

The following is the Brazilian roster in the 2017 FIVB Volleyball Men's U21 World Championship.

Head coach: Tambeiro Nery Pereira Jr.

Former squads

U21 World Championship
2001 –  Gold medal
Diogenes Zagonel, Murilo Endres, Rodrigo Santos, Riad Ribeiro, Bruna Silva, Evandro Guerra, Leandro Vissotto, Dante Trevisan, Roberto Minuzzi, André Luiz Eloi, Joao Grangeiro and Alberto Mendes
2003 –  Silver medal
Eder Carbonera, Raphael Margarido (c), Leandro da Silva, Michael dos Santos, Wallace Martins, Ricardo Aviz, Bruno Zanuto, Luiz Felipe Fonteles, Samuel Fuchs, Raphael de Oliveira, Leandro Greca and Joao Paulo Tavares
2005 –  Silver medal
Douglas Barbosa, Rodolpho Granato, Luiz Coelho, Thiago Machado, Tiago Brendle, Thiago Alves (c), Lucas Saatkamp, Marcus Jubé, Bruno Rezende, Igor Pinto, Thiago Sens and Silmar Almeida
2007 –  Gold medal
Wanderson Campos, Guilherme Hage, Lucas de Deus, Felipe Bandero, Tiago Barth, Tiago Gelinski, Wallace de Souza, William da Costa (c), Carlos Faccin, Deivid Costa, Bernardo Assis and José Santos Júnior
2009 –  Gold medal
Aurélio Figueiredo, Tiago Wesz, Maurício Borges Silva, Murilo Radke (c), Guilherme Koepp, Najari Carvalho, Isac Santos, Ygor Duarte, Renan Buiatti, Jairo Medeiros, Thales Hoss and Franco Paese 
2011 – 5th place
Bernardo Reitz, Matheus Cunda, Otávio Pinto (c), Ricardo Lucarelli Souza, Felipe Rosa, Guilherme Kachel, Vitor Dias, Renan Purificacao, Rafael Martins, Hugo Silva, Luan Weber and Lucas Loh
2013 –  Silver medal
Alan Souza, Eder Kock, Rogério Filho, Felipe Hernandez, Leandro Santos, Douglas Souza, Flávio Gualberto, Thiago Veloso (c), Lucas Madaloz, Leonardo Nascimento, Henrique Batagim and Carlos Silva
2015 – 4th place
Leonardo Nascimento, Rogério Filho, Robert Araujo, Pedro Silva, Rodrigo Leão, Douglas Souza, Johan Marengoni, Fernando Kreling (c), Caio Oliveira, Gabriel Kavalkievicz, Lucas Madaloz and Romulo Silva
2017 – 4th place
Davy Moraes, Felipe Roque, Matheus Silva (c), Henrique Honorato, Victor Cardoso, Daniel Mascarenhas, Gabriel Bertolini, Maique Nascimento, Luis Rodrigues, Alexandre Elias, Lucas Barreto and Pablo Ventura
2019 –  Bronze medal
Nathan Krupp, Bruno Ruivo, Gustavo Orlando, Rhendrick Rosa (c), Gabriel Cotrim, Marcus Coelho, Victor Cardoso, Lucas Figueiredo, Angellus Silva, Guilherme Voss Santos, Edson Paixão and Welinton Oppenkoski

See also
 Brazil women's national under-20 volleyball team
 Brazil men's national volleyball team
 Brazil men's national under-23 volleyball team
 Brazil men's national under-19 volleyball team

References

External links
 Official website 

Volleyball
National men's under-21 volleyball teams
Volleyball in Brazil